Etel Adnan (24 February 1925 – 14 November 2021) was a Lebanese-American poet, essayist, and visual artist. In 2003, Adnan was named "arguably the most celebrated and accomplished Arab American author writing today" by the academic journal MELUS: Multi-Ethnic Literature of the United States.

Besides her literary output, Adnan made visual works in a variety of media, such as oil paintings, films and tapestries, which have been exhibited at galleries across the world.

Life
Ethel N. Adnan was born in 1925 in Beirut, Lebanon. Adnan's mother Rose "Lily" Lacorte was Greek Orthodox from Smyrna and her father Assaf Kadri was a Sunni Muslim-Turkish high-ranking Ottoman officer born in Damascus, Ottoman Syria. Assaf Kadri's mother was Albanian. Adnan's grandfather was a Turkish soldier. Her father came from a wealthy family; he was a top officer and former classmate of Mustafa Kemal Atatürk at the military academy. Prior to marrying Adnan's mother, her father was already married with three children. In contrast, Adnan's mother was raised in extreme poverty; her parents met in Smyrna during World War I while her father was serving as Governor of Smyrna. After the Ottoman Empire collapsed and Smyrna was burned during the Occupation of Smyrna, Adnan's parents migrated to Beirut. Adnan stated that her mother was 16 years old when she met her father, at a time when "the Greeks in Turkey were in concentration camps." Though she grew up speaking Greek and Turkish in a primarily Arabic-speaking society, she was educated at French convent schools and French became the language in which her early work was first written. She also studied English in her youth, and most of her later work was first written in this language.

At 24, Adnan traveled to Paris where she received a degree in philosophy from the University of Paris. She then traveled to the United States where she continued graduate studies at the University of California, Berkeley and at Harvard University. From 1958 to 1972, she taught philosophy of art at the Dominican University of California in San Rafael. She also lectured at many universities throughout the United States.

Adnan returned from the US to Lebanon and worked as a journalist and cultural editor for Al Safa newspaper, a French-language newspaper in Beirut. In addition, she also helped build the cultural section of the newspaper, occasionally contributing cartoons and illustrations. Her tenure at Al Safa was most notable for her front-page editorials, commenting on the important political issues of the day.

In her later years, Adnan began to openly identify as lesbian.

Adnan lived in Paris and Sausalito, California. She died in Paris on 14 November 2021, at the age of 96.

Visual art
Adnan also worked as a painter, her earliest abstract works were created using a palette knife to apply oil paint onto the canvas – often directly from the tube – in firm swipes across the picture's surface. The focus of the compositions often being a red square, she was interested in the "immediate beauty of colour". In 2012, a series of the artist's brightly colored abstract paintings were exhibited as a part of documenta 13 in Kassel, Germany.

In the 1960s, she began integrating Arabic calligraphy into her artworks and her books, such as Livres d’Artistes [Artist's Books]. She recalls sitting for hours copying words from an Arabic grammar without trying to understand the meaning of the words. Her art was very much influenced by early hurufiyya artists, including Iraqi artist Jawad Salim, Palestinian writer and artist Jabra Ibrahim Jabra and Iraqi painter Shakir Hassan al Said, who rejected Western aesthetics and embraced a new art form which was both modern and yet referenced traditional culture, media and techniques.

Inspired by Japanese leporellos, Adnan also painted landscapes on foldable screens that can be "extended in space like free-standing drawings".

In 2014, a collection of the artist's paintings and tapestries were exhibited as a part of the Whitney Biennial at the Whitney Museum of American Art.

Adnan's retrospective at Mathaf: Arab Museum of Modern Art in Doha, titled "Etel Adnan In All Her Dimensions" and curated by Hans Ulrich Obrist, featured eleven dimensions of Adnan's practice. It included her early works, her literature, her carpets, and others. The show was launched in March 2014, accompanied by a 580-page catalog of her work published jointly by Mathaf and Skira. The catalog was designed by artist Ala Younis in Arabic and English, and included text contributions by Simone Fattal, Daniel Birnbaum, Kaelen Wilson-Goldie, as well as six interviews with Hans-Ulrich Obrist.

In 2017, Adnan's work was included in "Making Space: Women Artists and Postwar Abstraction," a group exhibition organized by MoMA, which brought together prominent artists including Ruth Asawa, Gertrudes Altschul, Anni Albers, Magdalena Abakanowicz, Lygia Clark, and Lygia Pape, among others.

In 2018, MASS MoCA hosted a retrospective of the artist, titled "A yellow sun A green sun a yellow sun A red sun a blue sun", including a selection of paintings in oil and ink, as well as a reading room of her written works. The exhibition explored how the experience of reading poetry differs from the experience of looking at a painting.

Published in 2018, "Etel Adnan", a biography of the artist written by Kaelen Wilson-Goldie, inquires into the artist's work as a shaman and activist.  In 2020, the Griffin Poetry Prize is awarded to her book Time.

Awards and recognition
 1977: Awarded the France-Pays Arabes award for her novel Sitt Marie Rose.
 2010: Awarded the Arab American Book Awards for her story collection Master of the Eclipse.
 2013: Her poetry collection Sea and Fog won the California Book Award for Poetry. 
 2013: Awarded the Lambda Literary Award.
 2014: Named a Chevalier des Arts et des Lettres by the French Government.
 2020: The poetry collection Time, selections of Adnan's work translated from French by Sarah Riggs, wins the Griffin Poetry Prize.

Adnan received a RAWI Lifetime Achievement Award from the Radius of Arab-American Writers.

Writing

In English
 Shifting the silence, Nightboat, 2020
 Time, Nightboat, 2020
 Surge, Nightboat, 2018
 Night, Nightboat, 2016
 Life is a Weaving, Galerie Lelong  (2016) .
 Premonition, Kelsey Street Press  (2014) .
 To look at the sea is to become what one is: An Etel Adnan Reader, edited by Thom Donovan, Brandon Shimoda, Ammiel Alcalay, and Cole Swensen, Nightboat Books (2014)
 Sea and Fog, Nightboat Books (2012)
 Master of the Eclipse (2009)
 Seasons (2008)
 In the Heart of the Heart of Another Country (2005)
 In/somnia (2002)
 There: In the Light and the Darkness of the Self and of the Other (1997)
 To Write in a Foreign Language (1996)
 Of Cities and Women, Letters to Fawwaz (1993)
 Paris, When It's Naked (1993)
 The Spring Flowers Own and the Manifestations of the Voyage (1990)
 The Arab Apocalypse (1989)
 Journey to Mount Tamalpais: An Essay (1985)
 The Indian Never Had a Horse and Other Poems (1985)
 From A to Z Poetry (1982)
 Sitt Marie Rose: A Novel (1978)
 Moon Shots, Sausalito-Belvedere Gazette (1967)
 "The Enemy's Testament" in Where is Vietnam?, Anchor Books (1967, Walter Lowenfels, ed.)

In Arabic
al-Sitt Mari Ruz: riwayah. (Sitt Marie Rose.), with Jirum Shahin and Firyal Jabburi Ghazul. Al-Qahirah: al-Hayah al-Ammah li-Qusur al-Thaqafah, 2000.
n mudun wa-nisa: rasail il Fawwaz. (Of Cities and Women.) Bayrut: Dar al-Hihar, 1998.
Kitab al-bahr; kitab al-layal; kitab al-mawt; kitab al-nihayah, with Abid Azarih. Bayrut: Dar Amwaj, 1994.
al-Sitt Marie Ruz. Bayrut: al-Mu-assasah al-Arabiyah lil-Dirasat wa-al-Nashr, 1979.

In French
 Voyage, guerre, exil, L'Echoppe, 2020
 Un printemps inattendu (entretiens), Galerie Lelong, 2020
 Grandir et devenir poète au Liban, L'Echoppe, 2019
 Tolérance, L'Echoppe, 2018
 Nuit, Editions de l'Attente, 2017
 La vie est un tissage, Galerie Lelong, 2016 
 Mer et brouillard, Editions de l'Attente, 2017
 A propos de la fin de l'Empire Ottoman, Galerie Lelong, 2015
 Le Prix que nous ne voulons pas payer pour l'amour, Galerie Lelong, 2015
 Prémonition, Galerie Lelong, 2015
 Là-bas, Editions de l’Attente, 2013
 Paris mis a nu. France: Éditions Tamyras, 2011, translated by Martin Richet. 
 Ce ciel qui n'est pas. Paris: L'Harmattan, 1997.
 Ce ciel qui n'est pas. Bilingual edition (French-Arabic): Tunis: Tawbad, 2008.
 Rachid Korachi: Ecriture passion, with Rachid Korachi and Jamel-Eddine Bencheikh. Alger: Galerie Mhamed Issiakhem, 1988.
 L'apocalypse arabe. Paris: Papyrus Éditions, 1980.
 Sitt Marie Rose. Paris: Des Femmes, 1978.
 Jbu: Suivi de l'Express Beyrouth enfer. Paris: P.J. Oswald, 1973.

Exhibitions 

 2022 Etel Adnan/Vincent van Gogh - Kleur als Taal, Van Gogh Museum, Amsterdam
 2021 Etel Adnan: Light's New Measure, Solomon R. Guggenheim Museum, New York 
2020 Satellites et Planètes, Galerie Lelong & Co, Paris 
 2019 Leporellos, Galerie Lelong & Co, Paris
 2019 New Work: Etel Adnan, SFMOMA, San Francisco 
 2019 Etel Adnan et les modernes, MUDAM, Luxembourg 
 2019 Etel Adnan: Each day is a whole world, Aspen Art Museum, Aspen 
 2018 Parler aux fleurs, Galerie Lelong & Co, Paris
 2018 Zentrum Paul Klee, Bern, Suisse
 2018 Estampes originales, Galerie Lelong & Co, Art Basel, Basel, Switzerland
 2018 Tout ce que je fais est mémoire, Chateau La Coste, Le Puy Ste Réparade, France
 2018 La Fulgurance du geste, Fondation Jan Michalski, Montricher, Basel, Switzerland
 2018 Tapisseries et estampes, Galerie Lelong & Co, Paris
 2017 Sea and Fog, Oakville Galleries, Oakville, Canada
 2017 L’emozione dei COLORI nell’arte, GAM, Castello di Rivoli, Italy
 2016 A Tremendous Astronomer, Galerie Lelong, Paris
 2016 Institut du Monde Arabe, Paris
 2016 Serpentine Gallery, London
 2016 Galerie Lelong, Paris
 2015 Museum Haus Konstruktiv, Zurich
 2015 Galerie Lelong Paris 
 2015 Saltwater, Istanbul Biennale
 2015 Galerie Lelong, New York
 2015 Irish Museum of Modern Art (IMMA ), Dublin
 2015 Sharjah Art Museum, EAU
 2014 Etel Adnan in all her dimensions, MATHAF, Doha, Qatar
 2014 Writing Mountains, Museum der Moderne, Salzburg
 2014 New Museum, New York
 2014 Whitney Biennale, Whitney Museum, New York
 2012 DOCUMENTA (13), Cassel.

Etel Adnan's works can be found in many collections, including the Centre Pompidou, Paris, Mathaf, Doha, Qatar, Royal Jordanian Museum, Tunis Modern Art Museum, Sursock Museum, Beirut, Institut du Monde Arabe, Paris, British Museum, London, M+, Hong Kong.

References

Bibliography
Amireh, Amal; "Bearing Witness: The Politics of Form in Etel Adnan's Sitt Marie Rose." Critique: Critical Middle Eastern Studies, 2005 Fall; 14 (3): 251–63. (journal article)
Amyuni, Mona Takieddine. "Etel Adnan & Hoda Barakat: De-Centered Perspectives, Subversive Voices." IN: Poetry's Voice-Society's Norms: Forms of Interaction between Middle Eastern Writers and Their Societies. Ed. Andreas Pflitsch and Barbara Winckler. Wiesbaden, Germany: Reichert; 2006. pp. 211–21
Cassidy, Madeline. "'Love Is a Supreme Violence': The Deconstruction of Gendered Space in Etel Adnan's Sitt Marie Rose." IN: Violence, Silence, and Anger: Women's Writing as Transgression. Ed. Deirdre Lashgari. Charlottesville: UP of Virginia; 1995. pp. 282–90
Champagne, John G. "Among Good Christian Peoples: Teaching Etel Adnan's Sitt Marie Rose." College Literature, 2000 Fall; 27 (3): 47–70.
Fernea, Elizabeth. "The Case of Sitt Marie Rose: An Ethnographic Novel from the Modern Middle East." IN: Literature and Anthropology. Ed. Philip Dennis and Wendell Aycock. Lubbock: Texas Tech UP; 1989. pp. 153–164
Foster, Thomas. "Circles of Oppression, Circles of Repression: Etel Adnan's Sitt Marie Rose." PMLA: Publications of the Modern Language Association of America, 1995 Jan; 110 (1): 59–74.
Ghandour, Sabah. "Gender, Postcolonial Subject, and the Lebanese Civil War in Sitt Marie Rose." IN: The Postcolonial Crescent: Islam's Impact on Contemporary Literature. Ed. John C. Hawley. New York, NY: Peter Lang; 1998. pp. 155–65
Hajjar, Jacqueline A. "Death, Gangrene of the Soul, in Sitt Marie Rose by Etel Adnan." Revue Celfan/Celfan Review, 1988 May; 7 (3): 27–33.
Hartman, Michelle. "'This Sweet/Sweet Music': Jazz, Sam Cooke, and Reading Arab American Literary Identities." MELUS: The Journal of the Society for the Study of the Multi-Ethnic Literature of the United States, 2006 Winter; 31 (4): 145–65.
Karnoub, Elisabeth. "'Une Humanité qui ne cesse de crucifier le Christ': Réécriture du sacrifice christique dans Sitt Marie Rose de Etel Adnan." IN: Victims and Victimization in French and Francophone Literature. Ed. Buford Norman. Amsterdam, Netherlands: Rodopi; 2005. pp. 59–71
Kilpatrick, Hilary. "Interview with Etel Adnan (Lebanon)." IN: Unheard Words: Women and Literature in Africa, the Arab World, Asia, the Caribbean and Latin America. Ed. Mineke Schipper. Trans. Barbara Potter Fasting. London: Allison & Busby; 1985. pp. 114–120
Layoun, Mary N. "Translation, Cultural Transgression and Tribute, and Leaden Feet." IN: Between Languages and Cultures: Translation and Cross-Cultural Texts. Ed. Anuradha Dingwaney and Carol Maier. Pittsburgh, PA: U of Pittsburgh P; 1995.  pp. 267–89
Majaj, Lisa Suhair. "Voice, Representation and Resistance: Etel Adnan’s Sitt Marie Rose." Intersections: Gender, Nation and Community in Arab Women's Novels. Ed. Lisa Suhair Majaj, Paula W. Sunderman and Therese Saliba. Syracuse, NY: Syracuse Univ. Press, 2002. 200–230.
Majaj, Lisa Suhair and Amal Amireh. Etel Adnan: Critical Essays on the Arab-American Writer and Artist. Jefferson, North Carolina: McFarland and Co, 2002. 
Marie, Elisabeth Anne. Sacrifice, sacrifiée, sacrificatrice: L'étrange triptyque: Sacrifices au féminin dans trois romans francophones libanais. Dissertation Abstracts International, Section A: The Humanities and Social Sciences, 2003 May; 63 (11): 3961. U of North Carolina, Chapel Hill, 2002.
Mejcher-Atassi, Sonja. "Breaking the Silence: Etel Adnan's Sitt Marie Rose and The Arab Apocalypse." IN: Poetry's Voice-Society's Norms: Forms of Interaction between Middle Eastern Writers and Their Societies. Ed. Andreas Pflitsch and Barbara Winckler. Wiesbaden, Germany: Reichert; 2006. pp. 201–10
Mustafa, Daliya Sa'id (translator). "Al-Kitabah bi-lughah ajnabiyyah." Alif: Journal of Comparative Poetics, 2000; 20: 133-43 (Arabic section); 300-01 (English section).
Muzaffar, May. "Iytil 'Adnan: Qarinat al-nur wa-al-ma'." Arabi, 2007 Feb; 579: 64–68.
Obank, Margaret. "Private Syntheses and Multiple Identities." Banipal: Magazine of Modern Arab Literature, 1998 June; 2: 59–61.
Shoaib, Mahwash. "Surpassing Borders and 'Folded Maps': Etel Adnan's Location in There." Studies in the Humanities, 2003 June-Dec; 30 (1-2): 21–28.
"Vitamin P3." Phaidon Press, 2017. 
Willis, Mary-Angela. "Francophone Literature of the Middle East by Women: Breaking the Walls of Silence." IN: Francophone Post-Colonial Cultures: Critical Essays. Ed. Kamal Salhi. Lanham, MD: Lexington; 2003. pp. 64–74
Willis, Mary-Angela. La Guerre démasquée à travers la voix féminine dans Sitt Marie Rose d'Etel Adnan et Coquelicot du massacre d'Evelyne Accad. Dissertation Abstracts International, Section A: The Humanities and Social Sciences, 2002 Mar; 62 (9): 3061. U of Alabama, 2001.

Further reading
 Works on Etel Adnan 
 Etel Adnan, Leporellos, Galerie Lelong & Co., 2020 
 Etel Adnan, Estampes, Galerie Lelong & Co. 2019 
 Simone Fattal, Etel Adnan, la peinture comme énergie pure, 2016
 Jean Fremon, Etel Adnan, être là. Galerie Lelong, 2015
 Hirahara, Naomi. We Are Here'', Hachette Book Group (2022)

External links

 
 
 Translated excerpt from Sitt Marie Rose
 Culturebase (in German)
 Anne Mullin Burnham, Reflections in Women's Eyes, 1994, Saudi Aramco World
 Etel Adnan's page on Archives of Women Artists, Research and Exhibitions
 

1925 births
2021 deaths
Abstract painters
American feminists
American people of Albanian descent
American people of Greek descent
American people of Syrian descent
American people of Turkish descent
Feminist studies scholars
Harvard University alumni
Lambda Literary Award for Lesbian Poetry winners
Lebanese feminists
Lebanese women writers
Lebanese women activists
Lebanese emigrants to the United States
American lesbian writers
Lebanese LGBT people
Artists from Beirut
University of California, Berkeley alumni
University of Paris alumni
Lebanese painters
Lebanese women painters
Lebanese contemporary artists
20th-century women artists
People from Sausalito, California
Poets from California
PEN Oakland/Josephine Miles Literary Award winners
American LGBT poets
American poets in French
American writers in French
American Arabic-language poets
Writers from Beirut
Lebanese expatriates in France
Lebanese essayists
21st-century American women writers